Anwar Zeb Khan is a Pakistani politician who war the Provincial Minister of Khyber Pakhtunkhwa for Zakat Usher & Social Welfare Special Education and Women Empowerment, in office from 3 September 2020 to January 2023. He had been a member of the Provincial Assembly of Khyber Pakhtunkhwa from 27 August 2019 to 18 January 2023.

Political career
Khan contested 2019 Khyber Pakhtunkhwa provincial election on 20 July 2019 from constituency PK-100 (Bajaur-I) on the ticket of Pakistan Tehreek-e-Insaf. He won the election by the majority of 1,176 votes over the runner up Waheed Gul of Jamaat-e-Islami Pakistan. He garnered 12,951 votes while Gul received 11,775 votes. He was inducted into Khyber Pakhtunkhwa Cabinet on 3rd September 2020.

References

Living people
Pakistan Tehreek-e-Insaf MPAs (Khyber Pakhtunkhwa)
Politicians from Khyber Pakhtunkhwa
Year of birth missing (living people)